Jordan Cardy (born 21 February 1996), known by his stage name Rat Boy, is an English musician from Chelmsford, Essex.

Early life
Cardy was born in Chelmsford, England on 21 February 1996. He studied at Chelmer Valley High School in Chelmsford and went on to study Art at Colchester Institute. Despite being dyslexic, he began writing songs in his spare time, releasing songs on SoundCloud under the name "Rat Boy", a name given to him by his school friends who claimed he looked like a rat. After college, Cardy was hired and subsequently fired from Wetherspoons, which provided inspiration for his first release on SoundCloud, The Mixtape.

Career
Rat Boy produced The Mixtape, a 5-track mix on which he performed vocals, keyboard and bass, recorded in his own home. He sent The Mixtape to various record companies and in response Drew McConnell (bassist for Babyshambles) arranged for Rat Boy to have a meeting with him; Cardy and his band were subsequently signed to Parlophone in early 2015. In addition to this, The Mixtape was featured in NME magazine and played by radio stations including BBC Radio 1, Radio X (formerly XFM) and BBC Radio 6.

Rat Boy was added to the BBC Sound of 2016 Longlist, an annual poll in which over 100 music specialists select artists they believe will be successful within the next 12 months. In December 2015, MTV released its Brand New for 2016, an annually released article and webseries containing artists to watch out for during the upcoming year. Rat Boy was shortlisted along with 10 other artists including Bonkaz, Jack Garratt and Rationale. He was also nominated for Best New Artist 2016 by NME magazine, which he subsequently won, along with performing his single "Move" at the awards ceremony.

In April 2017, Cardy's song "Knock Knock" was sampled on Kendrick Lamar's song "Lust", taken from the latter's fourth studio album, Damn. When he found out about the sample, he tweeted his appreciation for it.

On 11 August 2017, Rat Boy released his long-awaited debut album Scum to commercial success. The album was initially released with 13 tracks, however a deluxe 25-track version was also released. The deluxe version included more than 15 minutes of skits, samples and interludes, as well as an extra song "Sad Sad" featuring fellow indie musician Mallory Merk. The album reached No. 15 on the UK Albums Chart.

In December 2017, Cardy supported Liam Gallagher on his UK solo tour.

On 25 January 2019, Rat Boy released the studio album Internationally Unknown which was recorded in 2018.

Rat Boy featured on McFly's 2020 album Young Dumb Thrills on the song of the same title.

Rat Boy provided songs for the radio in the 2020 game Cyberpunk 2077 using the name IBDY. One song, "Who's Ready for Tomorrow", featured heavily in Cyberpunk: Edgerunners, the anime based in the same universe.

Musical style
Rat Boy's music is an amalgamation of several styles, most notably hip hop and indie rock. He has cited English bands the Clash and the Streets as his main musical influences and has been compared to artists such as Jamie T and the Beastie Boys. He is also a fan of Kendrick Lamar and Kasabian. Cardy has a DIY approach to his art and music, generally recording and producing his own tracks at home and creating all his own album art. Many of Cardy's songs consist of narratives and stories within the lyrics, as well as samples recorded of sounds and conversations from his daily life.

Discography

Studio albums
 Scum (2017) - UK No. 15
 Internationally Unknown  (2019)

EPs and mixtapes
 The Mixtape (2014)
 Neighbourhood Watch (2015)
 Get Over It (2016)
 Civil Disorder (2018)
 Government Vacation (2020)

Singles

Music videos 
 "Sign On" (2015)
 "Fake ID" (2015)
 "Wasteman" (2015)
 "Move" (2016)
 "Get Over It" (2016)
 "Revolution" (2017)
 "I H8 U" (2017)
 "Laidback" (2017)
 "Knock Knock Pt II" (2018)
 "Internationally Unknown" (2018)
 "Chip on My Shoulder" (2018)
 "Don't Hesitate" (2019)
 "Truth of the Youth" (2019)
 "Rewind" (2020)
 "Victim of a System" (2020)
 "Brave New World" (2020)

Tours
 The Dumb & Confused Tour (2018)

Awards and nominations

References

External links
 Official website

1996 births
Living people
British indie rock musicians
English hip hop musicians
English male singer-songwriters
English record producers
Rap rock musicians
NME Awards winners
People from Chelmsford
Musicians from Essex
Parlophone artists
Epitaph Records artists